is a documentary-style horror movie series made by Broadway Co., Ltd. in Japan. In summary, an investigation team goes on a search to research about "cursed" ghost videos from different people in Japan who have claimed to have tragic incidents involving these videos.

They showed raw footage of the Inokashira Park dismemberment incident and other weird and strange incidents. The docuseries aired every Friday night on Family Gekijo.

Work Flow 
Since the releases of Ring-Hen and Special 5, before the start of each volume, a text on screen calls attention to viewers.

Then the first submitted video is shown and the main title is displayed thereafter.

Staff

Executive Producers

Producers

Directors

Co-Directors

Composition Staff

Assistant Directors 
Matsue Era (2001-2002)

Sakamoto Era (2002-2005)

Fukuda Era (2005-2006)

Kodama Era (2006-2011)

Iwasawa Era (2011-2013)

Kikuchi Era (2013-2016)

Fukuda-Terauchi Era (2017-2018)

 Kawai-Fukuda Era (2018-2019)

KANEDA Era (2019-2020)

Makita Era (2020-2022)

Fujimoto Era (2022-Present)
Yūta Oga (Vol. 95-Present)
Maria Kise (Vol. 99-Present)

Other

Narrators

Music

Other Staff

Series List

Normal Series

Special Series

Version X Series

Other

See also
 Ring
 Noroi: The Curse
 Tokyo Gore School
 Faces of Death''

References

External links
 Broadway Official Website 
 PAL Entertainments Production 
 Zitsuroku!! Real kyoufu DX (Japanese Mobile Website)  
 Sarudama 
 

Japanese film series
Japanese horror films